New Medicine (formerly A Verse Unsung) is an American rock band from Minneapolis, Minnesota, formed in 2009.

History
New Medicine was originally formed as A Verse Unsung by two friends, Jake Scherer and Dan Garland, who were attending Orono High School at the time. The two would write lyrics during classes then work through them musically at Scherer's family's farm in Medina where he lived. Kenny Fritze and Aaron Gates were later added to the band and eventually replaced. They signed to Photo Finish Records after forming the new band with Ryan Guanzon and Matt Brady, calling themselves New Medicine. Their debut album, Race You to the Bottom, was released September 18, 2010. The band has toured with major recording artists such as Avenged Sevenfold, Halestorm, Buckcherry, and Stone Sour. Their songs "Race You to the Bottom," "Laid," and "Rich Kids" have all been added into rotation on Sirius XM Radio's Octane Channel.  "Laid" hit number 32 on the Mainstream Rock chart in Spring 2011, "Race You to the Bottom" hit number 19 on the Mainstream Rock chart in Spring 2012, and "Rich Kids" hit number 31 on the Mainstream Rock chart in Fall 2012, respectively. On December 21, 2012, Matt Brady announced he was leaving the band to spend more time with Joy2theWorld, which helps women and children in Ghana, west Africa. Later the same year, Ryan Guanzon left the band to produce music. Dylan Wood (ex-Emphatic) took the drums duties since then, and Kyle LeBlanc took over on bass guitar. They released their second album "Breaking the Model" on August 26, 2014 via Imagen Records, with the lead single "One Too Many" hitting number 40 on the Mainstream Rock. The band stated on their Facebook page that they have begun work on a new album as of November 28, 2013 and was released on August 25, 2014. Ryan Guanzon returned to the band for just one performance in April 2015 in the band's hometown of Medina, but did so to play guitar as current lead guitarist, Dan Garland, was not able to be there. Matt Brady also made an appearance on-stage that same night as he was in attendance. On April 27, 2015, it was announced that the band would be going on an indefinite hiatus.
This hiatus was ended on December 5, 2019 when the band declared via Facebook that they are working on a new album due to their increased following on Spotify. On March 13, 2020 they released their first song of the new album "Die Trying" with the same name. At the end of January 2021, the rock band posted in all social networks the news about the release of a new single together with Adelitas Way. On March 12, they released a new single "Own It" which contains a track of the same name and a rock remix.

Discography

Studio albums

Singles

Band

Current members
Jake Scherer  - lead vocals, rhythm guitar
Dan Garland - lead guitar
Matt Brady - bass, backing vocals
Ryan Guanzon - drums

Former members
Dylan Wood (drums)
Ryan Wood (rhythm guitar)
Kyle LeBlanc (bass)
Kenny Fritze
Aaron Gates

Tours
Burn Halo w/ Track Fighter and New Medicine. (Late Summer to Early Autumn 2009)
The Used/Chiodos & New Medicine Tour. (April 17, 2010)
Halestorm w/ Adelitas Way & Since October. (July 2010)
Uproar Festival w/ Avenged Sevenfold, Disturbed, & Stone Sour. (August 17 - October 4, 2010)
Rise From Ashes Tour w/ D.R.U.G.S. & Eyes Set to Kill. (December 4–19, 2010)
Nightmare After Christmas Tour w/ Avenged Sevenfold, Stone Sour, & Hollywood Undead. (January 20-February 13, 2011)
Revolt Tour with Hollywood Undead, Drive A, and 10 Years (April 6, 2011 - May 27, 2011).
Opened for the Shinedown Concert at the Ogden Theater, Denver, Colorado, April 2, 2012. Performed before Adelitas Way
Played Jager stage at Carolina Rebellion on May 5, 2012.
Played Jeremiah Weed Stage at Rockfest in Kansas City, Missouri, May 12, 2012.
Played FYE stage at Rock on the Range in Columbus, Ohio, May 19, 2012
Played Intersection in Grand Rapids, Michigan, to finish tour with Halestorm on July 21, 2012
Played the Carnival of Madness Tour with Cavo, Halestorm, Chevelle and Evanescence.
Played Wicked Moose, Rochester, Minnesota, with Buckcherry March 15, 2013
Played Medina Entertainment Center, Medina, Minnesota, with Buckcherry March 16, 2013
Played Herkirmer Block/Patio Party, Minneapolis, Minnesota, (1st show with new bass player and drummer) June 8, 2013
Played Medina Entertainment Center (Outdoors), Medina, Minnesota, with Hairball June 15, 2013
Played Tour with Halestorm fall/winter 2014
Played Buzzfest 32 at Cynthia Woods Mitchell Pavilion, The Woodlands, Texas, on October 18, 2014
Played Fine Line Music Cafe Minneapolis, Minnesota (homecoming Xmas show) with former drummer Ryan Guanzon's new Band "Late Night Fights" opening.  Former bass     player, Matt Brady, in attendance with stage diving. December 20, 2014
Played Medina Entertainment Center, Medina, Minnesota (Hometown/Final Show before Indefinite Hiatus) with Buckcherry and Cold Kingdom. Former drummer, Ryan Guanzon, handled lead guitar duties from the absent Dan Garland. Former bass player, Matt Brady, also in attendance. April 4, 2015

References

External links
 http://omnes.tv/unsigned/episode76/ Interview with Jake Scherer  who talks about recording new album and touring.

PureVolume
Myspace

Musical groups established in 2009
American hard rock musical groups
American post-grunge musical groups
Rock music groups from Minnesota